Eupithecia unedonata is a moth in the family Geometridae. It is found in Spain, France, Italy, Corsica, Sardinia, Sicily, Malta, Greece, Crete, Rhodes, North Africa (Morocco, Algeria, Tunisia, Libya, Egypt), Israel, Lebanon, Turkey and Transcaucasia.

The wingspan is 18–21 mm. There are two generations per year

The larvae feed on Arbutus unedo, Thymelaea hirsuta and Rhus tripartita. The species overwinters in the pupal stage, within a cocoon in the ground.

References

External links

Lepiforum.de

Moths described in 1868
unedonata
Moths of Europe
Moths of Africa
Moths of Asia
Taxa named by Paul Mabille